Héldon Augusto Almeida Ramos (born 14 November 1988), known simply as Héldon and sometimes nicknamed Nhuck (pronounced [ɲuk]), is a Cape Verdean professional footballer who plays as an attacking midfielder.

He spent most of his career in Portugal, primarily in representation of Marítimo, and joined Sporting CP in 2014. In the Primeira Liga, he also appeared for Rio Ave and Vitória de Guimarães, for a total of 174 games and 25 goals.

A full international since 2008, Héldon played for Cape Verde at two Africa Cup of Nations tournaments.

Club career

Early years and Marítimo
Born in Sal, Héldon made his professional debut in 2007 with C.F. Caniçal, in the Portuguese third division. He moved to C.D. Fátima in the following year, helping them win promotion to the second tier.

In August of the following year, Héldon signed with C.S. Marítimo of the Primeira Liga. On 26 November 2011, he scored his second official goal for the Madeira club – first in the league – a last-minute penalty in a derby against C.D. Nacional (2–2 away draw, his team played the entire second half with ten players).

On 8 December 2013, against the same opponent but in a home fixture, Héldon scored twice for the same result, as Nacional in turn played nearly 30 minutes with one man less.

Sporting CP
On 31 January 2014, Héldon joined fellow league side Sporting CP in a €1.5 million deal. He made his debut on 11 February, featuring the full 90 minutes in a 2–0 derby loss at S.L. Benfica. He scored his tenth goal of the season and first for his new team on 12 April, when he came on as a substitute for Diego Capel with two minutes remaining and confirmed a 2–0 win over Gil Vicente F.C. at the Estádio José Alvalade.

Héldon signed with Córdoba CF on 28 January 2015, on loan until the end of the campaign. He made his La Liga debut three days later, starting and being booked in a 1–0 away defeat against RC Celta de Vigo. He failed to find the net during his spell with the Andalusians, who suffered relegation.

On 8 August 2015, Héldon was loaned to Rio Ave F.C. for the upcoming top-flight season. He attained his first goals for the Vila do Conde-based side on 19 September, a first-half brace in a 3–0 victory at F.C. Paços de Ferreira.

Héldon spent the following two years still on loan, at Rio Ave and Vitória de Guimarães. He scored his first goal for the latter on 24 September 2017, netting in the last minutes of a 2–1 home win against former club Marítimo.

Middle East
On 2 July 2018, Héldon joined Al Taawoun FC on a two-year contract. He scored 11 competitive goals in his debut campaign in the Saudi Professional League, also winning the Kings Cup.

Héldon agreed to a one-year deal at Shabab Al Ahli Club of the UAE Pro League on 26 September 2020. The following 12 July he moved back to Saudi Arabia to join Al-Orobah FC of the First Division League on a two-year contract, leaving on 1 February 2022 by mutual consent.

International career
Héldon made his international debut for Cape Verde on 11 October 2008, replacing Ronny Souto during half-time of a 1–3 away loss against Tanzania for the 2010 FIFA World Cup qualifiers. He scored his first goal in his next game, opening a 2–0 friendly win in Malta on 4 September 2009. He was the country's top scorer during the 2012 Africa Cup of Nations qualifying campaign, recording two goals in a 4–2 victory over Liberia on 26 March 2011.

Héldon was named to the squad that participated in the 2013 Africa Cup of Nations held in South Africa, and featured in every game as the nation reached the quarter-finals. In their final group against Angola, he came on as a 46th-minute substitute and scored a last-minute winner, making it 2–1 and causing his team to advance. He was also selected for the 2015 Africa Cup of Nations, where he won and converted a penalty to equalise in a 1–1 draw against Tunisia in the team's opening game.

Héldon was also a gold medallist with the under-20 team at the 2009 Lusofonia Games in Portugal. He scored five goals in the tournament, including a hat-trick in a 7–1 win over India.

Career statistics

Club

International

Scores and results list Cape Verde's goal tally first, score column indicates score after each Héldon goal.

Honours
Al Taawoun
King Cup: 2019

Shabab Al Ahli
UAE League Cup: 2020–21

References

External links

1988 births
Living people
People from Sal, Cape Verde
Cape Verdean footballers
Association football midfielders
Batuque FC players
Primeira Liga players
Liga Portugal 2 players
Segunda Divisão players
C.D. Fátima players
C.S. Marítimo players
Sporting CP footballers
Rio Ave F.C. players
Vitória S.C. players
La Liga players
Córdoba CF players
Saudi Professional League players
Saudi First Division League players
Al-Taawoun FC players
Al-Orobah FC players
UAE Pro League players
Shabab Al-Ahli Club players
Cape Verde international footballers
2013 Africa Cup of Nations players
2015 Africa Cup of Nations players
Cape Verdean expatriate footballers
Expatriate footballers in Portugal
Expatriate footballers in Spain
Expatriate footballers in Saudi Arabia
Expatriate footballers in the United Arab Emirates
Cape Verdean expatriate sportspeople in Portugal
Cape Verdean expatriate sportspeople in Spain
Cape Verdean expatriate sportspeople in Saudi Arabia
Cape Verdean expatriate sportspeople in the United Arab Emirates